Alone in the Dark II is a 2008 horror film directed by Peter Scheerer and Michael Roesch and starring Rick Yune, Rachel Specter and Lance Henriksen. It is a sequel to Uwe Boll's 2005 film Alone in the Dark, although it features an entirely new cast and a story that is unrelated to the original film.

Alone in the Dark II was filmed in New York City and Los Angeles. It is loosely based on the Infogrames' Alone in the Dark video game series.

Premise
Former witch-hunter Abner Lundberg (Lance Henriksen) is forced to come back to fight his old nemesis, a century-old dangerous witch out on the prowl again. This time, Lundberg joins forces with Edward Carnby (Rick Yune) and they attempt to track down the dangerous witch Elisabeth Dexter (Allison Lange).

Cast

Release and reception
The film was released in Germany on September 25, 2008, in the United Kingdom on July 27, 2009 and in the United States on January 26, 2010. An American Blu-ray release is sold exclusively by Best Buy.

Reviewing the film for IGN, R.L. Shaffer wrote: "Uwe Boll's Alone in the Dark did not require a sequel. Critics hated the film. Fans hated the film. ... Thankfully though, Alone in the Dark II is actually a much better film than the first. It's a touch light on action, and the setting is far more limited in terms of production design, but the tone is a little more in keeping with the ideas of the game franchise. ... Look at Alone in the Dark II more as a reboot than a sequel and it plays OK".

YouTube critic James Stephanie Sterling reviewed the film along with Conrad Zimmerman on their podcast, remarking that the film was terrible enough that it was hard to believe there could be worse films.

References

External links
 

2008 films
2008 horror films
German sequel films
Alone in the Dark
Direct-to-video horror films
Live-action films based on video games
2000s psychological horror films
German supernatural horror films
Films about witchcraft
2000s English-language films
English-language German films
2000s German films